Savva Timofeyevich Morozov (Orekhovo-Zuevo, Bogorodsky Uyezd Moskovskaya Guberniya, Russian Empire – , Cannes, France) was a Russian textile magnate and philanthropist. Established by Savva Vasilyevich Morozov (1770–1862), the Morozov family was the fifth-richest in Russia at the beginning of the 20th century.

Biography 
Savva Timofeyevich Morozov came from an  Old Believer merchant family which held the hereditary civil rank of honorary citizens. This gave him freedom from conscription, freedom from corporal punishment, and freedom from taxation. He grew up at the Morozov house at Trehsvyatitelskaya Lane 1-3c1 on Ivanovo Hill in the  White City, now the  boulevards, of Moscow. He attended the nearby  gymnasium at  Pokrovsky Gates. His family home was the most expensive home in Moscow and its Morozov gardens became a favourite haunt of S. Aksakov, F. Dostoevsky, A.  Ostrovsky, L. Tolstoy, and P. Tchaikovsky. He later studied physics and mathematics at Moscow University (1885) where he wrote a study on dye and met  Mendeleev. Beginning on 7 January 1885, at 10 o'clock in the morning, textile workers at the Morozov factories in Bogorodsk, especially Orekhovo-Zuyevo, went on strike for several weeks. In 1885–1887 he studied chemistry at the University of Cambridge in the United Kingdom. While in England he studied the structure of the textile industry in Great Britain, especially in Manchester.

Savva Morozov married his second-cousin's wife Zinaida Grigorievna, née Zimin. They hosted lavish parties and balls which many distinguished Russians and Moscovites attended including Savva Mamontov, Botkin, Feodor Chaliapin, Maxim Gorky, Anton Chekhov, Konstantin Stanislavski, Pyotr Boborykin, and others.  Olga Knipper recalled one of these balls: "I had to go to the ball at Morozova: I've never seen such luxury and wealth." 

At the beginning of the twentieth century, Morozov was the largest shareholder of the Moscow Art Theatre (MAT) under Stanislavski and  Nemirovich-Danchenko. During the summer of 1902, with participation of both Ivan Fomin and Alexander Galetsky, Savva funded Schechtel's improvements to the  Lianozov-owned theatre built in 1890 at  Kamergersky Lane 3 in  Tverskoy. The renovations incorporated Anna Golubkina's high-relief plaster of The Wave above the right entrance of the theatre. In 1903 he funded the electrification of the theatre with its own electrical power station, and added another small stage which is isolated from the main building to allow full rehearsals during performances on the main stage. All of this made the MAT the most advanced theatre in Russia. For the fifth and sixth seasons (1902–04), Morozov funded the entire cost of the equipment and the operating costs of the building, too. This new theatre had seating for 1200 (a third more than the older building) and greatly enhanced MAT's profitability. However, the rent increased for the seventh season (1904–05) and Morozov ceased paying for the leasehold and the operating cost. He would only pay back the principal for the cost of the improvements, which took 9 years. When Gorky's Summerfolk was not well received by Nemirovich-Danchenko and Stanislavski, Gorky left the theatre and Morozov followed.

Influenced by Maxim Gorky, Morozov and his nephew Nikolai Pavlovich Schmidt were significant financial contributors to the Bolshevik faction of the Russian Social Democratic Workers Party, including making payments to the newspaper Iskra.

According to the author Suzanne Massie, writing in Land of the Firebird, Morozov had approached his mother and family matriarch about introducing profit-sharing with factory workers - one of the first industrialists to propose such an idea.  His mother angrily removed Savva from the family business, and one month later the apparently despondent Morozov shot himself while in the south of France. Morozov died from a  gunshot wound in Cannes, France.  His death was officially ruled a suicide; however, various murder-theories exist.

Gallery

Notes

References 

1862 births
19th-century businesspeople from the Russian Empire
1905 deaths
Russian expatriates in the United Kingdom
Philanthropists from the Russian Empire
Russian socialists
Bolshevik finance
Old Believers
Suicides by firearm in France
Alumni of the University of Cambridge
People from Orekhovo-Zuyevo
19th-century philanthropists
1905 suicides
Humanitarians from the Russian Empire